The women's 5000 metres at the 2009 World Championships in Athletics were held at the Olympic Stadium on 19 and 22 August

Medalists

Records

Qualification standards

Schedule

Results

Heats
Qualification: First 5 in each heat(Q) and the next 5 fastest(q) advance to the final.

Key: PB = Personal best, SB = Seasonal best

Final

Key:  CR = Championship record, DNF = Did not finish, DNS = Did not start, PB = Personal best, SB = Seasonal best

Splits

References
General
Specific

5000 metres
5000 metres at the World Athletics Championships
2009 in women's athletics